
The Book of the Bee ( / Ktābā d-debboritā) is a historiographic and theological compilation, containing numerous Biblical stories. It was written around 1222, by Solomon of Akhlat, who was Bishop of Basra, within the Church of the East. It is written in the Syriac language.

The book is a collection of theological and historical texts, and consists of 55 chapters discussing various topics including the creation, heaven and earth, the angels, darkness, paradise, Old Testament patriarchs, New Testament events, lists of kings and patriarchs, and the final day of resurrection. The book was very popular among local Christian communities, and it was transmitted up to the 19th century.

The author, Solomon of Akhlat, was a bishop of the Church of the East during the first half of the 13th century. He was a diocesan bishop of Basra (Basrah, Bassora), now in Iraq, and was present at the consecration of Patriarch Sabrisho IV in 1222. He dedicated the book to his friend, bishop Narsai of Beth Waziq.

The book was written in Classical Syriac, a literary form of Aramaic language, and it was also translated into Arabic. The author held his native Syriac language on high regard, and adopted a notion of some older authors that it was the oldest language. In the Book of the Bee, Solomon designated his language as Aramaic or Syriac, and his people as Arameans or Syrians (Syriacs/Assyrians), insisting that they did not take part in events that led to the condemnation and crucifixion of Christ:

The book was translated into Latin and published in 1866, by Joseph Schönfelder (d. 1913). In 1886, Syriac text was published with English translation, by British orientalist Ernest A. Wallis Budge (d. 1934).

See also 
 Syriac literature
 Syriac Christianity

References

Sources

External links
 The Book of the Bee, translated by E. A. Wallis Budge (1886)

13th-century books
13th century in the Mamluk Sultanate
13th-century Christian texts
Texts in Syriac
Middle Ages Christian texts
Nestorian texts